The Ilyushin Il-76 (NATO reporting name: Candid) is a multi-purpose, fixed-wing, four-engine turbofan strategic airlifter designed by the Soviet Union's Ilyushin design bureau. It was first planned as a commercial freighter in 1967, as a replacement for the Antonov An-12. It was designed to deliver heavy machinery to remote, poorly served areas. Military versions of the Il-76 have been widely used in Europe, Asia and Africa, including use as an aerial refueling tanker or command center.

The Il-76 has seen extensive service as a commercial freighter for ramp-delivered cargo, especially for outsized or heavy items unable to be otherwise carried. It has also been used as an emergency response transport for civilian evacuations as well as for humanitarian aid and disaster relief around the world. Due to its ability to operate from unpaved runways, it has been useful in undeveloped areas. Specialized models have also been produced for aerial firefighting and zero-G training.

Design and development

Origins
It was intended to replace the Antonov An-12. Another intended version was a double-decked 250-passenger airliner but that project was cancelled.

Production of Il-76s was allocated to the Tashkent Aviation Production Association in Tashkent, Uzbekistan, then a republic of the Soviet Union. Some 860 of the basic transport variants were manufactured. The prototype of the Il-76MF conducted its first flight on 1 August 1995.

Further development
From 2004 onwards, a number of aircraft in commercial service were modernized to the Il-76TD-90VD version; this involved the adoption of the newly developed PS-90 engine to comply with European noise limitations. In 2005, the People's Republic of China placed an order for 34 new Il-76MDs and four Il-78 tankers. In June 2013, Russian military export agency Rosoboronexport announced an order by China for 12 Il-76MD aircraft.

The Il-76 has also been modified into an airborne refuelling tanker, designated the Il-78, around 50 aircraft having been produced. A variant of the Il-76 also serves as a firefighting waterbomber. Its airframe was used as a base for the Beriev A-50 'Mainstay' AEW&C (airborne early warning and control) aircraft; around 25 aircraft were made. Another application for the type was found in Antarctic support flights and for conducting simulated weightlessness training for cosmonauts (akin to the "Vomit Comet" used by NASA). Beriev and NPO Almaz also developed an airborne laser flying laboratory designated A-60, of which two were built, much of this project's details remaining classified.

Il-76MD-90A
It was announced in 2010 that the production of a modernized Il-76, the Il-76MD-90A (also known as project Il-476 during the design stage), would begin; a proposed new production line would be located in Aviastar's facility in Ulyanovsk, Russia, and be operated in cooperation with the Tashkent works. At that point, the construction of two Il-76MD-90A prototypes had begun at the Ulyanovsk facility. The first Il-76MD-90A was rolled out at Aviastar's Ulyanovsk plant on 16 June 2014. On 29 April 2015, it was reported that the Russian Air Force received the first Il-76MD-90A built at the Ulyanovsk plant "Aviastar-SP" from the 2012 contract for 39 aircraft. The Russian Ministry of Defence (MoD) received its first serial production Ilyushin Il-76MD-90A airlifter on 2 April 2019. As of late 2022, 27 aircraft are ordered to be delivered in the period up to 2028 and 15 had been built.

Operational history
The first aircraft was delivered to the Soviet Air Force in June 1974. Next it became the main Soviet strategic transport aircraft. From 1976 it was operated by Aeroflot.

Between 1979 and 1991, the Soviet Air Force Il-76s made 14,700 flights into Afghanistan, transporting 786,200 servicemen, and 315,800 tons of freight. The Il-76 carried 89% of Soviet troops and 74% of the freight that was airlifted. As Afghan rebels were unable to shoot down high-flying Il-76s, their tactics were to try and damage it on takeoff or landing. Il-76s were often hit by shoulder-launched Stinger and Strela heat-seeking missiles and large-calibre machine gun fire, but because the strong airframes were able to take substantial damage and still remain operational, the aircraft had a remarkably low attrition rate during this period of conflict. Building on that experience, the bulk of the Canadian Forces equipment into Afghanistan was flown in using civilian Il-76s. In 2006, the Russian Air Force had about 200 Il-76s. Civilian users in Russia have 108.

On 3 August 1995, an Airstan Ilyushin Il-76 piloted by a Russian crew was forced down by a Taliban-controlled Afghanistan Air Force fighter in what became known as Airstan incident. The crew were imprisoned for nearly a year, but later escaped out of their confinement and managed to sneak into their aircraft still stuck at the airport and fly out of Afghanistan.

In 2004, a Chinese People's Liberation Army Air Force (PLAAF) Il-76 carried out a flight mission in Afghanistan, and later in 2011, PLAAF Il-76s were sent to Libya to evacuate Chinese citizens. The two missions were the reported first steps of PLAAF developing long-range transportation capability.

On 23 March 2007, a Transaviaexport Il-76 was shot down by an anti-aircraft missile while taking off from Mogadishu, Somalia. Everybody on board, seven crew and four passengers, were killed.

Syrian Air Force Il-76s, operating as civil Syrianair aircraft, have been reportedly used to ship weapons, money, and other cargo from Russia and Iran to Syria, according to a defected Syrian military pilot. Since the start of the war, in April 2011 (and up to July 2012), around 20 military flights have been conducted to and from Tehran, via Iraqi airspace. Further information exposes that since around 2012, Syrian Il-76s have regularly flown to Moscow's Vnukovo Airport to fetch shipments of Syrian banknotes that have been useful to Bashar al-Assad's government to survive Western sanctions.

On 14 June 2014, a Ukrainian Air Force Il-76 was shot down by ground fire from pro-Russian separatists while on approach to landing at Luhansk, resulting in the deaths of 40 soldiers and nine crew members on board.

On 30 January 2017, an IL-76 firebomber of the Russian EMERCOM agency was deployed to Chile to assist firefighters. This assignment took 39 days.

All Il-76 transport aircraft in service with the RF Aerospace Forces will receive anti-missile systems. The aircraft reconfiguration started in the spring 2019.

On 25 February 2022, during the 2022 Russian invasion of Ukraine, the Ukrainian State Special Communications Agency and US officials claimed that Russian Il-76s were shot down over Bila Tserkva. As of September 2022 no wreckage of the planes has been found.

On 4 April 2022, photographs of two destroyed Il-76s from the Ukrainian 25th Transport Aviation Brigade were displayed; these cargo planes were destroyed on the ground by Russian forces at Melitopol Airport.

Variants

Prototypes and developmental variants

Il-76TD-90 / Il-76MD-90 Engine upgrades to Perm PS-90s.
Il-76 firebomber Firefighting aircraft to drop exploding capsules filled with fire retardant.
Il-76PSD SAR version of Il-76MF
Il-96 Early development of convertible passenger/cargo aircraft, (project only, designation re-used later)
Il-150 proposed Beriev A-50 with Perm PS-90 engines.
Beriev A-60 Airborne laser weapon testbed. (Il-76 version 1A)

Special purpose / research variants

Il-76LL with reinforced wing (at least 3 aircraft) to be used as test-bed aeroplane for engine prototypes flight testing in Gromov Flight Research Institute.
Izdeliye-176 prototype Il-76PP.
Izdeliye-576
Izdeliye-676 Telemetry and communications relay aircraft, for use during trial programmes (prototype).
Izdeliye-776 Telemetry and communications relay aircraft, for use during trial programmes (prototype).
Izdeliye-976 ("SKIP", Il-976, or Il-76SK) – (СКИП – Самолетный Контрольно-Измерительный Пункт, Airborne Check-Measure-and-Control Center) Il-76/A-50 based Range Control and Missile tracking platform. Initially built to support Raduga Kh-55 cruise missile tests.
Izdeliye-1076 Special mission aircraft for unknown duties.
Izdeliye-1176 ELINT electronic intelligence aircraft, or Il-76-11

Military variants

Il-76-Tu160 tailplane transporter One-off temporary conversion to support Tu-160 emergency modification programme.
Il-76D ('D' for "Desantnyi", Десантный – "Paratrooper transport") has a gun turret in the tail for defensive purposes.
Il-76K/Il-76MDK/Il-76MDK-II Zero-g cosmonaut trainer (dlya podgotovki kosmonavtov), used by Yuri Gagarin Cosmonaut Training Center.
Il-76LL Engine testbed, (ooniversahl'naya letayuschchaya laboratoriya).
Il-76M Military transport version, (modifitseerovannyy – modified).
Il-76MD Improved military transport version, (modifitseerovannyy Dahl'ny – modified, long-range).
Il-76MD Skal'pel-MT Mobile Hospital
Il-76M / Il-76MD Built without military equipment but designated as Ms and MDs (Gordon – 'Falsies')
Il-76MD-90 An Il-76MD with quieter and more economical Aviadvigatel PS-90 high-bypass turbofan engines.
Il-76MF Stretched military version with a 6.6 m longer fuselage, PS-90A-76 engines, maximum takeoff weight of 210 tonnes and a lift capability of 60 tonnes. First flew in 1995, not built in series so far, just built for Jordan.
Il-76PP ECM aircraft, major problems with ECM equipment on the Izdeliye-176 only.
Il-76MD-M Modernized Il-76MD for the Russian Air Force.
Il-76MD-90A An upgraded version with a new glass cockpit, upgraded avionics, new one-piece carbon-fibre wing, and Aviadvigatel PS-90A-76 engines. It was also known as Il-476 while in development.
Il-76T/Il-76TD Built as military aircraft but given civilian designations. (Gordon – 'Falsie')
Ilyushin Il-78/Il-78M/Il-78MD-90A Aerial refuelling tanker.
Il-78 MKI A customized version of the Il-78 developed for the Indian Air Force.
Il-82 Airborne Command Post/communications relay aircraft, (alternative designation – Il-76VKP-'version65S').
Il-84 Maritime Search and Rescue aircraft, (alternative designation – Il-76PS-poiskovo-spasahtel'nyy), not produced.
Beriev A-50/Beriev A-50M/Beriev A-50I/Beriev A-50E Airborne Early Warning & Control aircraft. Beriev given control over the program.
Beriev A-100 An AEW&C version of the Il-76MD-90A.

Civil variants

Il-76MGA Initial Commercial freighter. (two prototypes and 12 production) equipped with Soloviev D-30 Turbofan engines.
Il-76MD to Il-76TD conversions Complete removal of military equipment, identified by crude cover over OBIGGS inlet in Starboard Sponson.
Il-76P / Il-76TP / Il-76TDP / Il-76MDP Firefighting aircraft. The Il-76 waterbomber is a VAP-2 1.5-hour install/removal tanking kit conversion. The Il-76 can carry up to 13,000 U.S. gallons (49,000 liters) of water; 3.5 times the capacity of the C-130 Hercules. Since this kit can be installed on any Il-76, the designation Il-76TP, Il-76TDP are also used when those versions of the Il-76 are converted into waterbombers. The Il-76P was first unveiled in 1990.

Il-76T ('T' for Transport, Транспортный) unarmed civil cargo transport version. NATO code-name "Candid-A". It first flew on November 4, 1978.
Il-76TD The civil equivalent of the Il-76MD, first flew in 1982, equipped with Soloviev D-30 Turbofan engines.
Il-76TD-90 An Il-76TD with Aviadvigatel PS-90 engines and a partial glass cockpit.
Il-76TD-90VD An Il-76TD with Aviadvigatel PS-90 engines and a partial glass cockpit. It was developed specially for Volga-Dnepr cargo company, which operates five aircraft as of 2021.
Il-76TD-S Civilian mobile Hospital, similar to Il-76MD Skal'pel-MT.
Il-76TF Civil transport stretched version with Aviadvigatel PS-90 engines. It is the civil version of the Il-76MF (none produced).

Foreign variants

Beriev A-50E/I For the Indian Air Force. Hosts Israeli Phalcon radar for AEW&C and Aviadvigatel PS-90 engines.
Il-76MD tanker Iraqi Air Force tanker conversions.
KJ-2000 Domestic Chinese airborne early warning and control conversion of Il-76, developed after A-50I was cancelled and currently in service with the armed forces of China.
CFTE engine testbed The China Flight Test Establishment (CFTE) currently operates a flying testbed converted from a Russian-made Il-76MD jet transport aircraft to serve as a flying testbed for future engine development programmes. The first engine to be tested on the aircraft is the WS-10A "Taihang" turbofan, currently being developed as the powerplant for China's indigenous J-10 and J-11 fighter aircraft. Il-76MD #76456, acquired by the AVIC 1 from Russia in the 1990s, is currently based at CFTE's flight test facility at Yanliang, Shaanxi Province.
Baghdad-1 Iraqi development with a radar mounted in the cargo hold enabling it to serve as AEW&C, used in the Iran–Iraq War.
One was destroyed on the ground during the 1991 Persian Gulf War; two others were flown to Iran where they remained. At least one went into service with the IRIAF. One aircraft crashed following a midair collision with a HESA Saeqeh fighter, during the annual Iranian military parade in Teheran. It can be distinguished from the Beriev A-50 by having the Il-76 navigator windows in the nose, which the A-50 does not.

Operators

Military and civil operators in 38 countries have operated 850+ Il-76 in large numbers. While Russia is the largest military operator of the Il-76, followed by Ukraine and India, Belarus' TransAVIAexport Airlines is the largest civilian operator.

Military operators
 
 Algerian Air Force – 11 Il-76s and five Il-78s in service as of December 2021.
 
 Angolan Air Force – six II-76TDs.
 
 Armenian Air Force – two Il-76s in service as of December 2021.
 
 Azerbaijan Air Force – two Il-76s in service as of December 2021.
 
 Belarusian Air Force – inherited a number of Il-76s from the Soviet Air Force. Two in service as of December 2021.
 
 People's Liberation Army Air Force operates 17 Il-76 aircraft, including three KJ-2000 AEW&C versions and some Il-78 tankers, with a further 30 due for delivery. When the deal for the Il-76MD-90 fell through, China instead received ten refurbished Il-76 from Russia and developed its own transport, the Xian Y-20.
 
 Egyptian Air Force – two Il-76MFs in service (from the Royal Jordanian Air Force).
 
 Equatorial Guinea Air Force – one Il-76 in service as of December 2021.

 
 Indian Air Force – 26 Il-76s (17 Il-76MDs, 6 Il-78MKIs, and 3 Beriev A-50s for AEW&C)
 
 Islamic Republic of Iran Air Force – five Il-76s in service as of December 2021.
 Islamic Revolutionary Guards Corps Air Force – three Il-76s in service as of December 2021.
 
 Russian Air Force – operated about 110 as of 2016.
 Border Service of the Federal Security Service of the Russian Federation (2016)
 National Guard Forces Command – operated nine as of 2016.
 
 Sudanese Air Force – one Il-76 as of December 2021.
 
 Syrian Air Force – two Il-76s in service as of December 2021.
 
 Ukrainian Air Force – inherited a large number of Il-76s from the Soviet Air Force, with seven remaining in service as of December 2021.  One was shot down in 2014 during the initial phase of the war in the Donbas region.
 
 Uzbekistan Air and Air Defence Forces – five in service as of December 2021.

Former military operators
 
 Iraqi Air Force – operated the Il-76, but none remain in service.
 
 The Libyan Air Force has operated the Il-76 although it may not remain in service.
 
 Soviet Air Force – operated hundreds of the aircraft, with an inventory of 310 in 1987. Most were dispersed to the successor states upon the breakup of the Soviet Union.
 
 Yemen Air Force – Il-76TD, operated by the 4th Aviation Brigade.
 
 Air Force of Zimbabwe

Civil operators
 
 Air Highnesses owned and operated Il-76T (EK-76300) on behalf of Aéro-Service.
 
 Azal Avia Cargo operates one Il-76TD.
 Silk Way Airlines operates seven, including five Il-76TD and two Il-76TD-90.
 
 Global Aviation Services
 
 TransAVIAexport Airlines operates six Il-76TDs.

 
 The Government of Kazakhstan operates one Il-76.
 Air Almaty operates an Il-76TD for leased operations.
 GST Aero operates 1 Il-76T.
 
 Botir Avia operates three, including one Il-76MD and two Il-76TD.
 Kyrgyzstan Airlines operates one Il-76TD.
 Reem Air
 
 Imtrec aviation of Cambodia operates Laos registered Il-76TD.
 
 Transafrica Airlines
 
 Jet Line International operates the Il-76.
 Tiramavia
 
 Air Koryo
 
 The Ministry of Emergency Situations operates an Il-76TD.
 Border Guard Service of Russia
 Abakan Avia operates three Il-76TDs.
 Airlines 400 operates two Il-76TDs.
 Airstars Airways operates four Il-76TDs on cargo services.
 Alrosa-Avia operates four Il-76TDs on charter services.
 Aram Air
 Atlant-Soyuz Airlines operates six, including two Il-76MDs and four Il-76TDs.
 ATRAN Cargo Airlines operates five, including three Il-76Ts and two Il-76TDs. At least one Il-76M may have been operated in the past.
 Atruvera Aviation operates three, including one Il-76MD and two Il-76TDs.
 Aviacon Zitotrans operates five, including four Il-76TDs.
 Aviast operates four, including one Il-76MD and three Il-76TDs.
 East Line operates the Il-76.
 Ilavia Airline operates six, including two Il-76MDs and four Il-76TDs.
 Magadan Avia Leasing is a lease and charter operator of the Il-76.
 Samara Airlines operates two Il-76TDs.
 Spair Airlines
 Tesis Aviation Enterprise operates nine Il-76TDs.
 Tyumen Airlines
 Uralinteravia
 Volga-Dnepr operates eight: four Il-76TDs and four Il-76TD-90VDs.
 
 Aerolift Sierra Leone operates Il-76 aircraft for special charter and cargo lift operations.
 
 Azza Transport operates two Il-76TDs.
 Green Flag Airlines
 
 Syrian Arab Airlines operates four, including three Il-76Ms.

 
 Turkmenistan Airlines operates eight Il-76TDs.
 
 ATI Aircompany operates a number of Il-76 models.
 Azov Avia Airlines operates two Il-76MDs.
 Khors Aircompany operates two Il-76MDs.
 Lviv Airlines operates three Il-76MDs.
 Ukraine Air Alliance operates four, including one Il-76MD and three Il-76TDs.
 Ukrainian Cargo Airways operates 21, including 19 Il-76MDs.
 Veteran Airlines
 Volare Airlines operates three, including two Il-76MDs and one Il-76TD.
 Yuzhmashavia operates two Il-76TDs.
 
 The United Nations Humanitarian Air Service has operated several of the type from the early to mid-1990s to now. Most of them are either ex-Aeroflot or one that the Russian Air Force has lent to the UN.
 
 Air Support Systems, LLC operates the Il-76/78 in firefighting duties in the US.
 
 Gulf Aviation Technology and Services operates a number of Il-76 aircraft on charter or lease.
 Phoenix Aviation operates 2 Il-76TDs.
 
 Avialeasing operates the Il-76 on a charter and lease basis.
 Uzbekistan Airways operates 14 Il-76TDs.

Former civil operators
 
 Angola Air Charter has operated an Il-76.
 
 Dvin Airlines operated an Il-76TD.
 Yerevan-Avia operated two Il-76 (EK86724 and EK86817).
 
 Belavia operated the Il-76 before its closure in 1999.
 Gomelavia operated five Il-76TD.
 
 Faso Airways operated a Il-76TD.
 
 Imtrec Aviation operated a Laotian registered Il-76.
 
 Air Congo operated an Il-76TD.
 
 The Republic of the Congo operates an Il-76.
 Trans Air Congo has operated an Il-76T.

 Cubana de Aviación used to operate two Il-76s.

 Ecuatorial Cargo operated one Il-76TD.
 Express International Cargo

 Sun Way has operated the Il-76TD.

 Atlant Hungary has operated the Il-76.
 Hungarian Ukrainian Air Cargo has operated the Il-76.
 
 Atlas Air has operated at least eight Il-76TD.
 Chabahar Air has operated at least two Il-76TD.
 Mahan Air has operated the Il-76.
 Payam Air operated two Il-76TD.
 Qeshm Air operated two Il-76TD (airline disestablished).
 Safiran Airlines
 Yas Air operated two Il-76TDs (registered as EP-GOL and EP-GOM).
 
 Iraqi Airways operated a single Il-76.

 Jordan International Air Cargo – has operated two Il-76MFs delivered in 2011. and operated for the Royal Jordanian Air Force which were sold to Egypt in 2018 and were delivered in 2019.

 Air Kazakhstan operated Il-76 aircraft until its closure in 2004.
 Kazakhstan Airlines operated the Il-76TD before its closure in 1997.
 Sayakhat Airlines operated the Il-76 previously.
 
 Inversija operated three, including two Il-76Ts and one Il-76TD.
 
 Jamahiria Air Transport operated the Il-76M, Il-76TD, and Il-78.
 Libyan Air Cargo, the cargo division of Libyan Arab Airlines, operates 21, including one Il-76M and 15 Il-76TD.
 
 Aerocom operated an Il-76MD as well as an Il-76T until as late as January 2005.
 Airline Transport operated a number of Il-76 aircraft, losing three in accidents in 2004 and 2005.
 
 Aeroflot operated large numbers of aircraft, especially during Soviet years, often on behalf of the Soviet military. However, none remain in service with the airline.
 Air STAN operated an Il-76TD.
 ALAK operated Il-76 aircraft before its closure in 1999.
 Aviaenergo operated the aircraft, but none remain in service.
 Continental Airways has operated the Il-76 in the past, but does not do so currently.
 Dacono Air has operated the Il-76.
 Domodedovo Airlines has operated the Il-76, but none is currently in service.
 KrasAir operated the Il-76, but none is currently in service.
 Krylo Airlines operated two Il-76TDs into 2005.
 Moscow Airways operated an Il-76TD in the early 1990s.
 Novosibirsk Air Enterprise operated the Il-76, but none is currently in service.
 Pulkovo Aviation Enterprise operated the Il-76, but none is currently in service.

 
 Air Tomisko operated 3 Il-76TDs. Two were leased from GST Aero which had been before in service of Kosmas Air, and one more was added in May 2006.
 Kosmas Air operated two Il-76TDs leased from GST Aero.
 
 Aeroflot was the main civil user of the aircraft during the period of the Soviet Union, although many of its aircraft were operated on behalf of the military.
 Jet Air Cargo was one of the first civil operators of the Il-76 in Russia other than Aeroflot.
 
 Air West operated at least six aircraft, although it is unclear how many remain in service.
 East West Cargo operated a number of Il-76s.
 Juba Air Cargo operated the Il-76.
 Badr Airlines operated two Il-76s.
 Trans Attico operated two Il-76TDs.
 Alfa Airlines

 
 Air Service Ukraine operated the Il-76MD.
 Air Ukraine and Air Ukraine Cargo operated the aircraft, although none were in service at the time of bankruptcy.
 BSL Airline operated as many as six Il-78s.
 Busol Airlines operated the Il-76 before its closure in 1998.
 South Airlines
 
 Yemenia operated two Il-76TDs.

Accidents 

As of March 2023, a total of 94 Il-76 series aircraft have been written off in crashes and other accidents. There were at average two Il-76 crashes or similar accidents per year since 1979, with more than 1000 casualties.
 On 23 November 1979, a Soviet Air Forces Il-76, registration CCCP-86714, banked left during an approach to Vitebsk Airport. Control of the aircraft was lost and the aircraft crashed, killing the crew of seven; this was the first loss of an Il-76.
 On 11 December 1988, an Aeroflot Il-76 crashed on approach to Leninakan, Armenia killing 77 of the 78 on board. The aircraft was on an air relief operation following the 1988 Armenian earthquake.
 On 18 October 1989, a Soviet Air Force Il-76 (CCCP-76569) crashed in the Caspian Sea off Sumqayit, Azerbaijan following wing separation caused by an engine fire, killing all 57 in Azerbaijan's deadliest air accident. The cause of the engine fire was traced back to a design flaw.
 On 1 February 1990, a Soviet Air Forces Il-76 registration СССР-86021 crashed 14 minutes after takeoff from Panevėžys Air Base. The crashed killed all 8 members of the crew.
 On 24 May 1991, a Metro Cargo Il-76TD (LZ-INK, named Lugano), crashed near Kermanshah Airport while attempting a forced landing following fuel exhaustion, killing four of ten crew.
 On 8 July 1993, a Russian Air Force Il-76M (RA-86039) crashed near Pskov Airport due to loss of control following an unexplained in-flight fire, killing the 11 crew.
 On 19 August 1996, Spair Airlines Flight 3601, an Il-76T, crashed while trying to land at Belgrade Nikola Tesla Airport following total electrical failure due to pilot error, killing all 14 occupants on board. The crew had forgotten to turn on the AC/DC converter following engine startup.
 On 12 November 1996, Kazakhstan Airlines Flight 1907, an Il-76, collided in mid-air with Saudia Flight 763 (a Boeing 747) over Charkhi Dadri, India, killing all 349 aboard both aircraft in the deadliest mid-air collision. The Kazakhstani crew failed to maintain altitude owing to confusion with ATC.
 On 27 November 1996, a Russian Air Force Ilyushin Il-76MD, registration RA-78804, flew into the side of a mountain, minutes after it departed Abakan Airport, and crashed  from the airport. All 21 occupants on board lost their lives in the accident.
On 13 July 1998, ATI Aircompany Flight 2570, an Il-76MD (UR-76424), crashed in the sea shortly after takeoff from Ras Al Khaimah International Airport, killing the eight crew. The aircraft was overloaded and the pilot failed to respond to GPWS warnings.
On 17 July 1998, Air Sofia Flight 701, an Il-78 (UR-UCI) struck a hill on approach to Asmara International Airport, killing all ten on board. The aircraft was leased from Ukrainian Cargo Airways.
 On 2 December 2001, Armed Forces of the Russian Federation Flight 9064 crashed at Novaya Inya, Russia, following an onboard fire, killing 18 on board.
 On 19 February 2003, an Ilyushin Il-76 crashed near Kerman, Iran under unspecified reasons (possibly weather-related). The crash killed 275 people, including hundreds of the Iranian Revolutionary Guard. The accident remains the deadliest involving the Il-76.
 On 8 May 2003, the rear loading ramp of an Il-76 leased by the Congolese government unexpectedly opened at 10,000 feet after taking off from the capital Kinshasa. Initial reports stated that over 120 policemen and their families had been sucked out in 45 minutes, but 14 people actually died.
On 30 June 2008, an Ababeel Aviation Il-76 crashed while taking off from Khartoum on a relief flight, killing the 4 crew members, the only people on board the plane.
On 2 July 2008, Click Airways Flight 1002, operated using an Ilyushin Il-76TD from Bagram Air Base to Al-Fujairah-Fujairah International Airport, suffered an Uncontained Engine Failure of its no. 3 engine at FL280. The failed engine parts struck the no. 4 engine resulting in its failure, as well as the fuselage and fuel tanks. The flight crew managed to successfully make an emergency landing at Zahedan, Iran.  None of the three crew sustained injuries.
On 15 January 2009, two Russian Ministry of Interior Il-76MDs were involved in a ground collision at Makhachkala Airport. One of the aircraft, registration RA-76825, was ready to depart and was positioned at the runway end when the other one, RA-76827, came in to land. The wing of the landing aircraft struck the flight deck of RA-76825 and a fire erupted. There were three fatalities in the departing aircraft, out of seven occupants on board. None of the 31 occupants aboard RA-76827 were hurt. RA-76825 was written off as a consequence of the accident.
 On 9 March 2009, an Aerolift Il-76 (S9-SAB) crashed into Lake Victoria just after takeoff from Entebbe Airport, Uganda, killing all 11 people on board. Two of the engines had caught fire on takeoff. The aircraft was chartered by Dynacorp on behalf of AMISOM. The accident was investigated by Uganda's Ministry of Transport, which concluded that all four engines were time-expired and that Aerolift's claim that maintenance had been performed to extend their service lives and the certification of this work could not be substantiated.
 On 22 September 2009, Islamic Republic of Iran Air Force Il-76MD Adnan 2 "5-8208" Simorgh crashed near Varamin killing all seven people on board. The crash was possibly the result of a mid-air collision with a Northrop F-5E Tiger II.
 On 1 November 2009, an Il-76 belonging to the Russian Ministry of the Interior crashed near the city of Mirny within 2 kilometers after taking off. Eleven people on board were confirmed as killed. After landing at Mirny, the crew locked the rudder and ailerons. The next day, the crew began disengaging the locking system (although it remained engaged). The crew checked the aileron controls, but the right aileron locked in the process. The aircraft took off, rolled 90 degrees to the right and crashed.
 On 28 November 2010 Sun Way Flight 4412, Il-76 4L-GNI, crashed in a populated area of Karachi, Pakistan, shortly after taking off from Jinnah International Airport. All eight people on board were killed, along with two people on the ground. The aircraft was reported to have been trying to return to Jinnah after suffering an uncontained engine failure and fire.
 On 6 July 2011, Silk Way Airlines Flight 995, an Il-76, tail number 4K-AZ55, crashed into a mountain in Afghanistan, while on final to Bagram Air Force Base. Eight people on board were initially confirmed as killed, with one unaccounted.
 On 30 November 2012, an Aéro-Service Il-76T (also reported as being operated by Trans Air Congo in the days after the accident) crashed 850 meters short of runway 5L of the Congo's Maya-Maya Airport in Brazzaville while landing during a violent storm, killing 32, including the 5 aircrew, another person on board and 26 people on the ground.
 On 1 July 2016, a Russian Ministry of Emergency Situations (EMERCOM) Il-76TD (RA-76840) struck a hillside near Rybnyi Uyan while fighting wildfires near Irkutsk, killing all ten on board.
On 11 April 2018, Algerian Air Force Ilyushin Il-76 7T-WIV crashed shortly after take-off from Boufarik Airport, Boufarik, Algeria. All 257 people on board were killed, making the accident the deadliest air crash on Algerian soil. 
 On 24 June 2022, Russian Air Force Il-76MD RF-78778 crashed and caught fire whilst landing near the city of Ryazan following an engine fire, killing five of nine on board.

Aircraft on display
 CCCP-76511 (c/n 083414444) preserved in the Ukraine State Aviation Museum, Kyiv. The aircraft was originally painted as UR-UCI of Ukrainian Cargo Airways to commemorate the real aircraft that crashed in 1998, but was returned to its original Aeroflot livery as CCCP-76511 in 2016.

Specifications (Il-76TD)

See also

References

Notes

Bibliography

External links

 Il-76TD, Il-76TD-90, and Il-76TF pages on Ilyushin's website
 The Ilyushin Il-76 and variants on Airvectors.net
 Il-476 production line photos on Englishrussia.com
 Ilyushin beriev Il-76 Candid (Gajraj) at Indian military database site
 Training aircraft at Yuri Gagarin Cosmonauts Training Center

AWACS aircraft
Il-076
1970s Soviet cargo aircraft
1970s Soviet military transport aircraft
Quadjets
T-tail aircraft
High-wing aircraft
Aircraft first flown in 1971